Static Age may refer to:
 Static Age, an album by the Misfits
 "Static Age", a song by the Misfits on that album
 The Static Age, a post punk band named for the Misfits album
 "The Static Age", a song by Green Day on the album 21st Century Breakdown